Sudha Cars Museum is an automobile museum located in Hyderabad, India. The museum displays "crazy cars" that resemble everyday objects. These cars are handmade by Kanyaboyina Sudhakar (known mainly as K. Sudhakar or K. Sudhakar Yadav) who started it as his hobby in his school days and opened the dedicated museum in 2010.

Exhibits 
Sudhakar Yadav had an inclination towards motor cars and mechanics since childhood. He created his first car at the age of 14 collecting the necessary articles from junkyards. His name was in the Guinness World Records in 2005 for the largest tricycle. Yadav and his museum are mentioned in the Limca Book of Records and have also been featured on Ripley's Believe It or Not!

All the exhibits of the museum accompany a plaque giving information of the make of the car, the time it took to manufacture and the maximum speed it can attain. The museum also has the smallest double decker bus in the world which can accommodate 10 people.

Yadav stated that some of the cars are created keeping special occasions in mind. For Women's Day, he designed a car shaped like a handbag and stiletto that was powered by a 6cc engine. For Bal Diwas (Children's Day), he designed cars based on a pen, pencil and sharpener. A condom shaped car was unveiled to commemorate World AIDS Day.

The homemade cars cost around ₹85,000–₹150,000 (£1,000–£1,800) for manufacturing; but are not for sale. The cars are often brought out of the museum for road shows where people can see them being driven.

Gallery

See also 
List of automobile museums

References 

Museums in Hyderabad, India
Automotive museums
Tourist attractions in Hyderabad, India
Guinness World Records
Museums established in 2010
2010 establishments in Andhra Pradesh